Campbell Creek is a stream in the U.S. state of South Dakota.

History
Campbell Creek was named in honor of an early rancher.

See also
List of rivers of South Dakota

References

Rivers of Harding County, South Dakota
Rivers of South Dakota